Awards and decorations of the Soviet Union are decorations from the former Soviet Union that recognised achievements and personal accomplishments, both military and civilian. Some of the awards, decorations, and orders were discontinued after the dissolution of the Soviet Union, while others are still issued by the Russian Federation as of 2021. Many of the awards were simply reworked in the Russian Federation, such as the transition of Hero of the Soviet Union to Hero of the Russian Federation, and Hero of Socialist Labour to Hero of Labour of the Russian Federation. A wide range of Soviet awards and decorations cover the extensive and diverse period of history from 1917 to 1991.

Honorary titles

Orders

Military orders

Military and civil orders

Civil orders

Military medals

General

Campaign medals

Second World War defensive campaign medals

Second World War offensive campaign medals

Civilian medals

Development/restoration campaigns

Maternity medals

Commemorative medals

Soviet Armed Forces jubilees

Second World War jubilees

Other commemorative medals

Note: Several Soviet decorations were worn in full, so a ribbon bar was not created. However, since the fall of the USSR, some medals have had ribbon bars created for them. An asterisk, *, denotes these medals. Awards not showing a ribbon are worn in full at all times.

See also
 Orders and Medals of Soviet Republics
 Badges and Decorations of the Soviet Union
 Orders, decorations, and medals of the Russian Federation
 Awards and Emblems of the Ministry of Defence of the Russian Federation
 Awards of the Ministry for Emergency Situations of Russia
 Awards of the Ministry of Internal Affairs of Russia
 Awards of the Federal Border Service of the Russian Federation
 Honorary titles of the Russian Federation
 Orders, decorations, and medals of Belarus
 List of awards of independent services of the Russian Federation
 List of "Umalatova" awards
 Socialist orders of merit

References

Sources
 Paul D. McDaniel, Paul J. Schmitt (1997). The Comprehensive Guide to Soviet Orders and Medals. .
 V.D. Krivchov (2003). AVERS No. 6 Definitive Catalog of Soviet Orders and Medals. Moscow.
 V.D. Krivchov (2008). AVERS No. 8 Definitive Catalog of Soviet Badges and Jetons 1917–1980. Moscow.

Further reading

External links
 Mondvor Narod—A very detailed site on the topic of Soviet Orders and Medals 
 www.soviet-medals-orders.com—A personal website by a collector from Switzerland, Oldrich Andrysek, presenting extensive collection of Soviet, Transdniestrian, Eastern European and some Mongolian awards with descriptions, images, news, reference materials of interest to phalerists and collections of soviet memorabilia.  Well-illustrated, with exchange section and info on fraud.

 
 
Soviet
Soviet Union-related lists